Wacław Michał Zaleski (8 September 1799 in Olesko, eastern Galicia – 24 February 1849 in Vienna), pseudonym Wacław from Olesko, was a Polish nobleman, poet, writer, researcher of folklore, theatre critic, political activist, and governor of Galicia (1848). Galician landowner and deputy to the Parliament.

His sons were Filip Zaleski - the governor of Galicia and the member of the Austrian House of Lords, and Antoni (1842-1866, writer) and Józef Mieczysław (1838-1899, cavalryman, later commander of the division and field marshal), married to Martyna Grabianszczanka from Ostapkowce.

Zaleski collected and published in Lviv Pieśni polskie i ruskie ludu galicyjskiego (Polish and Russian songs of the Galician Nation; 1833), which contained about 1,500 works, including 160 with piano accompaniment composed by Karol Lipiński. It was the largest collection of folk songs published in Poland before Oskar Kolberg.

Zaleski was an author of patriotic songs, paraphrases, translations of Ukrainian dumas and never-published stage works.

His grandson - austrian Minister Wacław Michal Artur Zaleski obtained the hereditary title of Austrian Count from Emperor Franz-Josef.

References
 
 

1799 births
1849 deaths
Polish folklorists
Polish male poets
Polish activists
Polish theatre critics
Polish translators
Academic staff of the University of Lviv
19th-century Polish poets
19th-century translators
19th-century Polish male writers
Governors of the Kingdom of Galicia and Lodomeria
Burials at Lychakiv Cemetery